The 44th Annual American Music Awards took place on November 20, 2016, at the Microsoft Theater in Los Angeles. It was broadcast on ABC and was hosted by Gigi Hadid and Jay Pharoah. The 2016 AMAs fell 31% from 2015 among adults 18-49 and 26% among viewers, to 8.2 million watching the show, which was an all-time low in the show's history.

Performances

Presenters

Bebe Rexha
Hailee Steinfeld
Taraji P. Henson
Octavia Spencer
Nina Dobrev
Ciara
Matt Bomer
Heidi Klum
Donnie Wahlberg
Zoe Saldana
Karlie Kloss
Steven Yeun
Robert Downey Jr.
Teyana Taylor
Idina Menzel
Julianne Hough
Blake Jenner
Gigi Gorgeous
Erin Foster 
Sara Foster 
Florida Georgia Line
Ansel Elgort
Rebecca Romijn
Mark Cuban
Jenny McCarthy
Olivia Munn
Chrissy Teigen
Rachel Platten
Bella Thorne
Keke Palmer
Janelle Monáe
Hannah Jeter
Steven Yeun
TJ Miller
Milla Jovovich
Savvy Shields
Ryan Seacrest
Bryce Harper
Beyonce

Red Carpet

Performers
Emeli Sandé
Spencer Ludwig

Hosts
Bailee Madison
Jeannie Mai
Laura Marano
George Kotsiopoulos
Rocsi Diaz
Roshon Fegan
Kira Kazantsev

Winners and nominees
The nominations were announced on October 10, 2016. The winners are in bold.

Special awards
 Award of Merit
 Sting

References

2016
2016 awards in the United States